The discography of Basement, an English rock band, consists of three studio album, five extended plays, three singles and two music videos.

Studio albums

Extended plays

Singles

Other appearances

Music videos

See also
 List of songs recorded by Basement

References

Post-hardcore group discographies
Discographies of British artists